Ararat Tehran Basketball Club is an Iranian professional basketball club based in Tehran, Iran.

Tournament records

Iranian Super League
 2007–08: 9th place
 2008–09: 12th place

Notable former players

  Julius Nwosu

External links
Page on Asia-Basket

Basketball teams in Iran
Sport in Tehran